The 2018–19 Houston Cougars women's basketball team represented the University of Houston during the 2018–19 NCAA Division I women's basketball season. The season marked the sixth for the Cougars as members of the American Athletic Conference. The Cougars were led by fifth-year head coach Ronald Hughey. They played their home games at Fertitta Center, which reopened on December 1, 2018, after a $60 million upgrade. The Cougars played their first three non-conference home games at H&PE Arena while construction on Fertitta Center was completed. They finished the season 15–16, 9–7 in The American play to finish in fourth place. They lost to South Florida in the quarterfinals of the American Athletic Conference women's tournament. They received an at-large bid to the Women's National Invitation Tournament, where they lost to Arkansas in the first round.

Media
All Cougars games home and away are aired on the Houston Cougars IMG Sports Network, streamed online via the Houston Portal, with Gerald Sanchez and Louis Ray on the call. Before conference season home games were streamed on Houston All-Access. Conference home games rotated between ESPN3, AAC Digital, and the Houston Portal. Road games typically streamed on the opponents' websites, though some conference road games also appeared on ESPN3 or AAC Digital.

Roster

Schedule and results

|-
!colspan=12 style=| Non-conference regular season

|-
!colspan=12 style=| AAC regular season

|-
!colspan=12 style=| AAC Women's Tournament

|-
!colspan=12 style=| WNIT

Rankings
2018–19 NCAA Division I women's basketball rankings

See also
 2018–19 Houston Cougars men's basketball team

References

External links
Official website

Houston Cougars women's basketball seasons
Houston
Houston Cougars
Houston Cougars
Houston